Anais Catala is a half Iraqi and half French model of 3 thirds of Jewish faith.

Daughter of an Iraqi mother and French father, she was a delegate in Miss Earth 2007 competing as Miss Iraq and held the title for Miss Iraq 2007 being only 20 years old.

She resides in Paris, France. Anais is fluent in French, English and German.

External links
Anais Catala Profile at jurgita.com
Beautiful Iraq by Brian Whitaker
Anais Catala at Waleg
Anais Catala Miss Iraq 2007
Miss Iraq 2007 by the Pageant News Bureau

Year of birth missing (living people)
Living people
French female models
French people of Iraqi-Jewish descent